Ben Bowen (born 5 June 1976 in England) is a Canadian trumpet player and children's musician from Hamilton, Ontario, Canada. Bowen studied jazz trumpet at York University and Humber College. He is a session musician for various other bands and as of 2011 has been involved in 29 studio albums.

Recent work
Breaking from his role as horn-player, in December 2011 he released a 5-song debut EP of traditional children's songs entitled The Bumblebee EP, which one reviewer called "wonderfully gentle and soothing." Bowen sings and plays guitar on this recording, backed by his sister Anna Bowen on accordion and vocals, and his brother-in-law Ben on mandolin and vocals. It was recorded by singer-songwriter Nick Zubeck at Cardinal Song studios in Guelph, and released on iTunes.

 Discography 

 Albums The Bumblebee EP (2012)Let's Sing A Song (vol.1) (2017)Beautiful Day (2017)Let's Sing A Song (vol.2) (2017)O Watch the Stars (2018)Sleep Now - lullabies (2019)

Session Work
Over the past ten years Bowen has worked on numerous albums as a session musician. He has played and recorded with a number of notable Canadian artists, including Lily Frost, Great Aunt Ida, Junetile, A Northern Chorus, Valery Gore, Nick Zubeck, Brian MacMillan, Bellewoods, and Old World Vulture.

 Danny Medakovic − Jolley Cut (2014)
 Old World Vulture − Trophy Lovers (2012)
 Great Aunt Ida − Nuclearize Me (2012)
 Valery Gore − Avalanche to Wandering Bear (2008)  trumpet on Scared, Great Lakes and Sparrow A Northern Chorus − The Millions Too Many (2007)  brass on The Millions Too Many, No Stations, Canadian Shield and Ethic of the Pioneer''

References

External links
 Official webpage
 Official children's music website

1976 births
Living people
Canadian trumpeters
Male trumpeters
York University alumni
Humber College alumni
Musicians from Hamilton, Ontario
Canadian children's musicians
21st-century trumpeters
21st-century Canadian male musicians